The Knox Memorial Bridge crosses the Intracoastal Waterway north of Ormond Beach, Florida. Highbridge Road (CR 2002) passes over the bridge.

History
Highbridge Road was built at the latest around 1910 as part of the John Anderson Highway, which became part of the Dixie Highway around 1915. The section north of Highbridge Road is still known as John Anderson Highway; the section to the south is now John Anderson Drive.

The Intracoastal Waterway in the area was built in 1890. The current bridge was built in 1955, and according to USGS topographic maps, the road was a bit to the south before then. There may have been a ferry at the location before 1955, or possibly a lower bridge.

Florida Scenic Route

Knox Memorial Bridge is part of the northern leg of the Ormond Scenic Loop and Trail, a Florida Scenic Highway, designated on July 9, 2007.

References

Bridges in Volusia County, Florida
Bridges completed in 1955
Intracoastal Waterway
Bascule bridges in the United States
Road bridges in Florida
1955 establishments in Florida
Steel bridges in the United States